Eucalyptus urna, commonly known as merrit, is a species of mallet or marlock that is endemic to southern areas of Western Australia. It has smooth bark, lance-shaped adult leaves, flower buds in groups of seven to thirteen, creamy yellow to white flowers and urn-shaped fruit.

Description
Eucalyptus urna is a mallet or marlock that typically grows to a height of  but does not form a lignotuber. It has smooth grey to white, often glossy silvery bark. Flowering has been recorded in most months and the flowers are creamy yellow to white.

Taxonomy and naming
Eucalyptus urna was first formally described in 1999 by Dean Nicolle in Australian Systematic Botany from specimens collected by Ian Brooker near Newdegate in 1988. The specific epithet (urna) is a Latin word meaning water jar or urn, referring to the shape of the fruit.

Distribution and habitat
This mallet is widespread and often locally abundant east and south-east of Perth and east of Lake Grace to Caiguna. It grows on flats in open woodland, often with an understorey of Melaleuca species.

Conservation status
This eucalypt is classified as "not threatened" by the Western Australian Government Department of Parks and Wildlife.

See also
List of Eucalyptus species

References

Eucalypts of Western Australia
urna
Myrtales of Australia
Plants described in 1999